E.A. Patras is a Greek omnisports club founded in 1927 and based in Patras. It is mostly known for its volleyball and boxing sections, which compete at the highest level in Greece. The volleyball section won the Greek championship in 1938, whereas the boxing section won the national title in 1979, 1983, 1984, 1988 and 1989.

E.A. Patras Volleyball - A1 Ethniki

E.A. Patras was one of the protagonists after the establishment of the Greek volleyball league in the 1930s, winning the title in 1937-38 and being the runner-up in the seasons 1935-36, 1936–37 and 1939-1940.

E.A.P. returned to the first Greek league for the first time after the formation of the A1 Ethniki Volleyball, by winning the A2 Ethniki title in 1999. It took the fifth place in A1 Ethniki two times in a row (2003–04, 2004–05) and during those three years it participated in the European Federation Cup.

The season (2008–2009) was the most successful so far for EAP in the post-war period. It took the 3rd place in the national championship which allowed the club to participate once more to the European Federation Cup in the season 2009-2010.

The next season (2009–2010) the club held an impressive record during the regular season of the A1 Ethniki Volleyball with 18 wins, 4 losses and 53 points, finishing in the second place, only behind Panathinaikos VC. But in the playoffs the club's performance was disappointing ending up in the 7th place of the league.

In the season 2010-2011, EAP finished in the fifth place in the championship.

Greek Cup 
Apart from Athens' and Thessaloniki's major volleyball clubs, EAP - representing Patras - was the fourth club from a provincial Greek city that made it to the final of the Greek Volleyball Cup, in the season 2007-2008. The previous ones were: Ethnikos Alexandroupolis (1981), Orestiada (1993) and Lamia (2007). In the final EAP lost 1-3 to Panathinaikos VC.

Titles & honours

National: (1)
Greek Championship: 1938
Divisional: (3)
 Second Division (A2 Ethniki) Championship: 2002
 Third Division (B Ethniki) Championship: 1996
 Fourth Division (C Ethniki) Championship: 1993
Greek Cup
Greek Cup finalist: 2008
European Cup honours
European Federation Cup quarter finals: 2006
Challenge Cup final four: 2009
Challenge Cup semi finals: 2011

Rankings in the Greek Volleyball Leagues

European Cup Honours

In 2005-2006 E.A. Patras reached the quarter finals of the European Federation Cup, being defeated twice by the Italian club of Macerata Volleyball (0-3 in Patras and 3-1 in Marche).

EAP also participated in the 2008-2009 Challenge Cup's Final Four in Izmir (Smyrna), taking the fourth place.

In 2010-2011 it participated in the Challenge Cup going up to the semi-finals, where it lost (like in 2006) two times (1-3, 3-0) to the further champions Macerata Volleyball.

External links 
Official site

References 

Greek volleyball clubs
1927 establishments in Greece
Boxing clubs in Greece
Sport in Patras